Abigail Dean is a British writer, living in south London. Her first novel is Girl A (2021).

Biography
Dean was born in Manchester. She grew up in Hayfield, Derbyshire, and went to Cambridge to study English literature. After her degree she took a law conversion course, eventually specialising in information technology law, in which she has had a career. She works as a lawyer for Google.

In 2019 it was reported that Dean received a six-figure sum from UK publisher HarperCollins for her first novel Girl A and another, The Conspiracies. She reportedly received a seven-figure deal from US publisher Viking Press. Girl A was published in the UK in January 2021.

Publications
Girl A. London: HarperCollins, 2021. .

References

External links

British writers
British women writers
People from Hayfield, Derbyshire
Living people
Year of birth missing (living people)
Place of birth missing (living people)